The Acleistoceratidae is a family of oncocerids that contains genera characterized by depressed (or rarely compressed) exogastric brevicones and cyrtocones (Sweet, 1964 K398) that range from the Middle Silurian to the Middle Devonian.  The siphuncle is broadly expanded, and in some actinosiphonate.

The Acleistoceratidae are derived from Oncoceras (Oncoceratidae) through Amphycertoceras, independently of the Oonoceras stock. The family is named for the genus Acleistoceras. All told some 22 genera have been described.

References

 Flower,R.H. 1950; Flower & Kümmel; A Classification of the Nautiloidea; Journal of Paleontology, Vol 24, no 5, pp604–610, Sept 1950
 Sweet, W.C. 1964; Nautiloidea-Oncocerida, in the Treatise on Invertebrate Paleontology, Part K Nautiloidea, Geological Society of America and University of Kansas Press.

Prehistoric nautiloid families
Silurian first appearances
Middle Devonian extinctions